North Dakota Highway 43 (ND 43) is a state highway located in extreme north-central North Dakota.

Route description

ND 43 runs in a virtually east–west direction its entire length. Shortly after the route begins, ND 43 enters Turtle Mountain State Forest, where the highway curves slightly but eventually straightens out again. In Roland Township, ND 43 passes south of Lake Metigoshe and crosses Oak Creek.

Major intersections

References

0043
Transportation in Bottineau County, North Dakota
Transportation in Rolette County, North Dakota